Emma Pittman (born 29 December 1992) is a former Australian rules footballer who played for  and  in the AFL Women's (AFLW). She also has a history in association football, having played four matches for the Brisbane Roar in the W-League.

Early life
Pittman was born and raised in Mackay, Queensland but moved to Brisbane at the age of 15 following the tragic loss of her mother. She began playing association football when she moved to Brisbane in an attempt to make friends but her ability soon shone through as she made her way through representative teams. At the age of 20, she was signed by the Brisbane Roar's W-League team.

Association football
Pittman played four matches as a striker including in two starts for the Brisbane Roar in the W-League in the 2012–13 season.

Australian rules football
Pittman was a late starter to Australian rules football, only taking the game up in adulthood. She first learnt the game while playing with local club Coorparoo before joining the University of Queensland in the AFL Queensland Women's League. In 2017 she earned selection in the league's team of the year and also represented her state in an exhibition match against Western Australia.

She was later drafted by Brisbane with the club's fifth pick and the 37th selection overall in the 2017 AFL Women's draft.

In April 2019, Pittman joined expansion club Gold Coast. Pittman struggled with injury at the Suns, suffering two ACL injuries and missing the entirety of the 2020 season. She played two games at the backend of the 2021 season, before being registered as an inactive player for the first season of 2022 to focus on her hospitality business. At the end of that season, she was delisted.

See also

List of players who have converted from one football code to another

References

External links

1992 births
Living people
Sportspeople from Mackay, Queensland
Sportswomen from Queensland
Australian rules footballers from Queensland
Brisbane Lions (AFLW) players
Brisbane Roar FC (A-League Women) players
Soccer players from Brisbane
Women's association football forwards
Australian women's soccer players
Gold Coast Football Club (AFLW) players